Diane Lynn Harkey (born June 20, 1951) is an American politician who served as a member of the California State Board of Equalization, representing its fourth district from 2015 to 2019. A member of the Republican Party, she was previously elected to the Dana Point City Council (2004–2008), including a stint as Mayor of Dana Point (2007–2008), as well as the California State Assembly (2008–2014). She was a Republican candidate for California's 49th congressional district seat in the 2018 election, losing to Democrat Mike Levin.

Early years and education
Born in Joliet, Illinois, Harkey moved to California with her family as a young girl. Harkey graduated cum laude from the University of California, Irvine, with a Bachelor of Arts in economics.

Banking career
Harkey has served as a vice-president in the banking industry and has had a 30-year career in corporate banking and finance.

Political career

Dana Point
Harkey's involvement in politics began in 1989, when she actively campaigned for the incorporation of the City of Dana Point. Harkey has served as a board member of the Ocean Institute and Dana Point Fifth Marine Regiment Support Group, a trustee for the Capistrano Valley Symphony, and a member of the Chamber of Commerce. She served on the Dana Point City Council from 2004 to 2008, and during that period, in 2007, she served as the city's mayor.

California State Senate election, 2006
In 2006, Harkey ran against then-Assemblyman Tom Harman for the 35th State Senate District in one of the closest California State Senate races in the state's history. Harman defeated Harkey for the Republican nomination by 225 votes or roughly 0.2% of the vote and went on to win the general election by 44,000 votes.

California State Assembly
In 2008, she ran as the Republican nominee for the 73rd State Assembly district against Democratic nominee Judy Jones. Harkey received the endorsements of the Republican Congressional delegation in the district, Assemblywoman Mimi Walters (who vacated the seat to run for State Senate), former opponent state Senator Tom Harman, over 80 elected officials in Orange and San Diego Counties, and the Republican Assembly Women's Caucus. Harkey won the election with 53.4% of the vote, while Jones received 40.6% of the vote. She served in the Assembly from November 2008 to November 2014.

State Board of Equalization
In 2014, Harkey became term-limited in the State Assembly and ran for a seat on the California State Board of Equalization representing the 4th district, which encompasses Imperial, Orange, Riverside, and San Diego counties, as well as small portions of Los Angeles and San Bernardino counties. She came in second place in the June 3 nonpartisan blanket primary with 34.0% of the vote, and subsequently won the November general election by a margin of 61.6% to 38.4%. In 2017 she was selected by her colleagues on the board to serve as board chair.

She chose not to seek reelection in 2018, choosing instead to run for Congress to represent California's 49th congressional district. Her term on the board ended in January 2019.

Tenure
Harkey represents the communities of Aliso Viejo, Coto De Caza, Dana Point, Ladera Ranch, Laguna Hills, Laguna Niguel, Mission Viejo, Rancho Santa Margarita, California, San Clemente, San Juan Capistrano, and Trabuco Canyon.

Harkey has been an outspoken opponent of California High-Speed Rail, introducing several pieces of legislation to defund the project.

In 2017, the California Department of Finance audited the Board of Equalization and found a conference in Harkey's district had brought in 98 board employees to perform duties including "registration, parking lot duty, and break area facilitation". Harkey denied that she was involved in redirecting staff to these activities.

In 2017, a California State Personnel Board audit of the California State Board of Equalization recommended the dismissal of one of Harkey's aides. The audit found that the aide was allowed to work from the agency's New York office, and that Harkey's staff "used their positions of authority to improperly influence, and arguably pressure, BOE executives to ensure placement" of the aide to a permanent civil service position.

Interest group ratings
As of 2008, Harkey had received an "A" lifetime rating from the NRA.

As of 2013, Harkey had a 100% rating from the Capitol Resource Institute, a socially conservative interest group in California.

In a March 2016 opinion piece, Harkey noted that while gas prices around the U.S. had recently dropped dramatically, California prices had stayed high. She pointed out that even though the State Board of Equalization had approved decreases in the state gas tax, prices had not gone down accordingly. The reason for this, she explained, was "overreaching regulatory policies", such as "the cap and trade and low-carbon fuel fees".

Harkey has a 100% rating from the California Taxpayers Association, and an "A−" grade from the anti-tax Howard Jarvis Taxpayers Association for the six years she served in the California State Assembly.

Committee membership
Business Tax Committee – Chair
Franchise Tax Board – Member
Member of the State Assembly, she served as Vice Chair for the Assembly Committees on Revenue and Taxation and Appropriations.

Political positions

Immigration 
She would like to strengthen border security, and believes that California should pay more attention to that issue. She supports President Trump's desire to build a wall on the southern border of the United States.

Environment 
Harkey supports taking care of the environment but has stated America is damaging its economy with unnecessary climate change laws. She believes America shouldn't be leading the global fight against climate change when other countries like India and China are releasing higher levels of greenhouse gases. She doesn't support the federal plan to increase offshore drilling in California by the Trump administration, and believes California should get an exemption like the one given to Florida.

Economic issues 
Harkey supports the Trump administration's 2017 tax reform, especially as it affects employers, but has criticized how it got rid of state and local tax deductions for many California residents.

Harkey supports free trade and has found some of the Trump administration's trade pacts "frightening" but believes the issues will resolve themselves.

Gun policy 
Harkey said she's not a supporter of gun control laws "because the bad guys will always have guns". She has stated that school shootings are actually the result of drugs and mental health issues, as well as children spending too much time with games and cell phones during their formative years. She has stated children should not have access to cell phones in schools, and that schools should be doing more to identify and address children with mental health issues. She has stated support for locking down schools and arming teachers with guns if they're comfortable with it, but believes that isn't a country-wide solution.

Healthcare 
Harkey has stated that the Affordable Care Act has caused healthcare costs to rise in California. She has stated that Medicare is a failing program and does not support its expansion. She believes the federal government should be doing more to instill healthy habits in children and focus on improving healthcare technology to bring down healthcare costs. She has stated the NIH should be doing more to treat mental illness.

President Donald Trump 
Harkey has been endorsed by Donald Trump and supports some of his policies, though has said he lacks "charisma" and his mannerisms are "not attractive", often making women uncomfortable. She wishes he would post on Twitter less often.

Electoral history

California U.S. House of Representatives 49th District election, 2018 
On June 5, 2018, in the California "jungle primary", Harkey advanced to the November 2018 general election for California's 49th congressional district, finishing with the most votes in a crowded primary field. She advanced to the general election alongside Democratic environmental activist Mike Levin of nearby San Juan Capistrano, assuring that this north San Diego County-based district would be represented by someone from the Orange County portion.

In May 2018, the Orange County Register endorsed Harkey for the U.S. House. In July, the Tea Party Express, America's largest tea party PAC, endorsed Harkey. In late August, President Donald Trump tweeted what the San Francisco Chronicle described as "a glowing endorsement" of Harkey.

Harkey was defeated in the November 2018 general election by Levin, who received 55% of the vote to Harkey's 45%.

Orange County Supervisor 5th district election, 2022

Personal life
After the 2008 economic downturn, Diane’s husband, Dan Harkey and his company, were sued by investors for real-estate related losses.  Initially, the litigation filed in 2009 included Diane Harkey, who was dismissed with prejudice in 2013 by the plaintiffs and the court of all erroneous charges during the course of a public Jury trial.

Notes

References

External links
  (Board of Equalization)
  (Campaign)
 
 Join California Diane Harkey

1951 births
21st-century American politicians
21st-century American women politicians
American bankers
American women bankers
California city council members
Women city councillors in California
Living people
Mayors of places in California
Republican Party members of the California State Assembly
People from Dana Point, California
People from Joliet, Illinois
Women mayors of places in California
Women state legislators in California
Candidates in the 2018 United States elections